Tusculum is a country estate on Cherry Hill Road in Princeton, New Jersey, built in 1773 for John Witherspoon, president of Princeton University and signer of the Declaration of Independence.  It is named after the Roman town of Tusculum, which was home to the country villa of Marcus Tullius Cicero.  The property was often visited by George Washington and his wife, Martha, during Witherspoon's tenure as president of Princeton University.  In 2013 the home was sold for $5.5 million.

See also

National Register of Historic Places listings in Mercer County, New Jersey

References

National Register of Historic Places in Mercer County, New Jersey
Houses in Princeton, New Jersey
New Jersey Register of Historic Places